Janardhan Madhavrao Waghmare (born ) is an Indian politician who was the Member of Parliament in the Rajya Sabha from Maharashtra. Before that he was the President of Latur Municipal Council.

Waghmare has also served the First Vice Chancellor of Swami Ramanand Teerth Marathwada University, Nanded and as Principal of Rajarshi Shahu College, Latur.  He is known as the architect of the famed Latur Pattern style that helped students from Marathwada rank high in competitive exams.

In 2022, Waghmare was awarded the Shahu Award for his work in the field of education.

Further reading

References

Living people
1934 births
People from Latur
Marathi politicians
Nationalist Congress Party politicians from Maharashtra
Indian Buddhists
Rajya Sabha members from Maharashtra
Dr. Babasaheb Ambedkar Marathwada University alumni
Savitribai Phule Pune University alumni
Osmania University alumni